Yazvitsy is a rural locality (a village) in Posyolok Zolotkovo, Gus-Khrustalny District, Vladimir Oblast, Russia. The population was 18 as of 2010.

Geography 
Yazvitsy is located 40 km northeast of Gus-Khrustalny (the district's administrative centre) by road. Imeni Vorovskogo is the nearest rural locality.

References 

Rural localities in Gus-Khrustalny District